"Scars" is a song by British singer-songwriter James Bay from his debut studio album Chaos and the Calm (2014). It was released exclusively to digital retailers on 8 January 2015 by Republic Records. The song is to be released in September as the third single from Bay's debut studio album Chaos and the Calm (2014). An audio video supporting the song was also uploaded on January 8, 2014 on YouTube. The song was written by Bay himself and produced by Jacquire King.

Background and release
The song was released on 8 January 2015. Prior to this, it was also immediately available buy pre-ordering his debut studio album Chaos and the Calm, which was released on December 15, 2014.

Critical reception
The song earned early acclaim from Aimee Curran of Baeble Music, whom praised Bay's "soulful, indie sound" and that "there's no reason why you wouldn't want it in your permanent music catalog." On 13 January 2015, Spotify listed the song at number 4 on the Top 10 Most Viral Tracks in the UK.

Music video
The music video was released on 28 August 2015 and directed by Benno Nelson and Nils d'Aulaire.

Live performances
Bay has performed the song at the Bing Lounge on 4 June 2014, at the Beacons Festival on 21 August 2014 and recently at BBC Radio 1's Future Festival in January 2015.

Track listing
Digital download
"Scars" – 4:32

Charts

Certifications

Release history

References

2015 singles
2014 songs
Folk ballads
Republic Records singles
Rock ballads
Universal Music Group singles
Songs written by James Bay (singer)
Song recordings produced by Jacquire King
James Bay (singer) songs